Candelaria is one of the 20 municipalities of the state of Trujillo, Venezuela. The municipality occupies an area of 411 km2 with a population of 27,811 inhabitants according to the 2011 census.

Parishes
The municipality consists of the following seven parishes, with their capitals listed in parentheses:

Arnoldo Gabaldón (Minas)
Bolivia (Bolivia)
Carrillo (Torococo)
Cegarra (Mitón)
Chejendé (Chejendé)
Manuel Salvador Ulloa (Sabana Grande) 
San José (Las Llanadas)

References

Municipalities of Trujillo (state)